Coccothrinax miraguama is a palm which is endemic to Cuba.

Three subspecies are recognised: C. miraguama subsp. havanensis, C. miraguama subsp. miraguama, and C. miraguama subsp. roseocarpa.

References

miraguama
Trees of Cuba
Plants described in 1816